Fellows of the Royal Society elected in 1974.

Fellows 

Sir Walter Fred Bodmer
William Robert Boon
Kenneth Burton
Hugh John Forster Cairns
Sir Roy Yorke Calne
David Roderick Curtis
John Frank Davidson
Jack David Dunitz
Pehr Victor Edman
John Douglas Eshelby
Jack Halpern
Stephen William Hawking
Volker Heine
Robert Aubrey Hinde
Albert Edward Litherland
James Ephraim Lovelock
Richard Ellis Ford Matthews
Drummond Hoyle Matthews
Peter Dennis Mitchell
Samuel Victor Perry
Norman James Petch
John Robert Philip
Sir John Charlton Polkinghorne
Charles Wayne Rees
John Rishbeth
Roger Valentine Short
John Trevor Stuart
Robert Henry Stewart Thompson
Sir John Robert Vane
Frederick John Vine
Stephen Esslemont Woods
Pierre Henry John Young

Foreign members

Renato Dulbecco
George Herbert Hitchings
Giuseppe Paolo Stanislao Occhialini
Jean-Pierre Serre

Statute 12 Fellow 
Sir Vivian Ernest Fuchs

References

1974
1974 in science
1974 in the United Kingdom